Timo Mäkinen (18 March 1938 in Helsinki, Finland – 4 May 2017) was one of the original "Flying Finns" of motor rallying. He is best remembered for his hat-trick of wins in the RAC Rally and the 1000 Lakes Rally.

Career

Mäkinen's start in international rallying came in the 1959 1000 Lakes Rally (now Rally Finland), in a Triumph TR3. He later drove works Austin-Healeys and Minis. In the big Healey, he finished fifth in the RAC Rally in 1963. Mäkinen drove Minis during most of 1964 but came second in the RAC Rally in a Healey, at the end of that year. He returned to the Mini Cooper S in 1965, winning the Monte Carlo Rally and the 1000 Lakes, and capturing a Coupe des Alpes at the Alpine Rally. He came second in the 1965 RAC Rally, again in a Healey.

In 1967, Timo Mäkinen drove his Mini at a high speed through the famous Ouninpohja stage of the 1000 Lakes with the car's bonnet open. Leather straps holding the bonnet were not thoroughly tightened, and they opened after a few rough bounces. He tried to put his head out of the side window but his helmet was too big and he could only stick his head halfway out. So he had to skid the car sideways continuously to see the road ahead. Even so, Mäkinen was third fastest on that special stage and he also won the rally overall, for the third year in a row.

In 1975, Mäkinen won the RAC for the third time in a row, at the wheel of a Ford Escort RS1800, preceded only by Erik Carlsson (Saab 96) in that feat. Mäkinen won the Finnish Rally Championship three times, the ice track championship six times and the saloon car race championship three times.

In 1969, Mäkinen competed in the very first Round Britain Powerboat Race, which he won. In 1994, Mäkinen made a brief return as Mini celebrated the 30th anniversary of their 1964 Monte Carlo win by Paddy Hopkirk, who also participated in the event. Mäkinen retired on the second stage with a fuel system problem. In 2010, he was among the first four inductees into the Rally Hall of Fame, along with Carlsson, Hopkirk and Rauno Aaltonen.

Mäkinen also traveled to Australia to race Mini Coopers in the Bathurst 500 road race. He finished 6th outright and 3rd in class in 1965 co-driving with N.Irish rally driver Paddy Hopkirk while finishing 7th outright and 3rd in class in 1967 with Australian driver John French.

Death
Timo Makinen died on May 4, 2017 of natural causes in Helsinki, Finland.

Career results

Complete IMC results

Complete WRC results

Complete British Saloon Car Championship results
(key) (Races in bold indicate pole position; races in italics indicate fastest lap.)

Complete Bathurst 500 results

International wins
 1964 Tulip Rally (Mini Cooper S)
 1965 Monte Carlo Rally (Mini Cooper S)
 1965 1000 Lakes Rally (Mini Cooper S)
 1966 1000 Lakes Rally (Mini Cooper S)
 1966 Three Cities Rally (Mini Cooper S)
 1967 1000 Lakes Rally (Mini Cooper S)
 1972 Hong Kong Rally (Ford Escort RS1600)
 1973 Arctic Rally (Ford Escort RS1600)
 1973 1000 Lakes Rally (Ford Escort RS1600)
 1973 RAC Rally (Ford Escort RS1600)
 1974 RAC Rally (Ford Escort RS1600)
 1974 Rallye Côte d'Ivoire (Ford Escort RS1600)
 1975 RAC Rally (Ford Escort RS1800)
 1976 Rallye Côte d'Ivoire (Peugeot 504 V6)

References

1938 births
2017 deaths
Finnish rally drivers
Sportspeople from Helsinki
World Rally Championship drivers